Princess Margherita of Bourbon-Parma (1 January 1847 – 29 January 1893) was the eldest child and daughter of Charles III, Duke of Parma and Princess Louise Marie Thérèse of France, the eldest daughter of Charles Ferdinand, Duke of Berry and Princess Caroline Ferdinande Louise of the Two Sicilies.

Margherita was thus a great-granddaughter of Charles X of France. She was born in Lucca, Duchy of Parma. She was a niece of Henri, comte de Chambord, disputedly King of France and Navarre from 2 to 9 August 1830 and afterwards the Legitimist Pretender to the throne of France from 1844 to 1883. Through her marriage to Carlos de Borbón y Austria-Este, Carlist claimant to the Spanish throne.

Early life
She was born in Lucca, Duchy of Parma, was the eldest child and daughter of Charles III, Duke of Parma and Princess Louise Marie Thérèse of France, the eldest daughter of Charles Ferdinand, Duke of Berry and Princess Caroline Ferdinande Louise of the Two Sicilies. Margherita was thus a great-granddaughter of Charles X of France. She was a niece of Henri, comte de Chambord, disputedly King of France and Navarre from 2 to 9 August 1830 and afterwards the Legitimist Pretender to the throne of France from 1844 to 1883.

Marriage
Margherita married Carlos de Borbón y Austria-Este, eldest son of Juan de Borbón y Braganza and his wife Archduchess Maria Beatrix of Austria-Este, on 4 February 1867 at Schloss Frohsdorf in Frohsdorf, Lower Austria, Austrian Empire.

Issue

 Blanca de Borbón y de Borbón-Parma (1868–1949) 
 ∞ Archduke Leopold Salvator of Austria, Prince of Tuscany, had issue.
 Jaime de Borbón y de Borbón-Parma (1870–1931)
 Elvira de Borbón y de Borbón-Parma (1871–1929) died unmarried, but with illegitimate issue who bore the name de Bourbon.
 Beatriz de Borbón y de Borbón-Parma (1874-1961) 
 ∞ Fabrizio Massimo, Principe di Roviano, had issue.
 Alicia de Borbón y de Borbón-Parma (1876–1975) 
 ∞ Friedrich, Prince von Schönburg-Waldenburg, had issue.
 ∞ Lino del Prete, had issue.

Margherita died on 29 January 1893, in Viareggio, Tuscany, Kingdom of Italy. Carlos remarried the following year to Princess Marie-Berthe of Rohan-Rochefort.

Ancestry

References

|-

1847 births
1893 deaths
People from Lucca
Princesses of Bourbon-Parma
Daughters of monarchs